Dragonfly (also known as Shuttle Chess or Bird Chess) is a chess variant invented by Christian Freeling in 1983. There are no queens, and a captured bishop, knight, or rook becomes the property of the capturer, who may play it as their own on a turn to any open square. The board is 7×7 squares, or alternatively a 61-cell hexagon with two additional pawns per side.

The game is an offshoot and simplification of a Freeling game named Loonybird (or Dragon Chess). Still, "Play is complex and interesting. Draws are rare too."

Game rules
The standard rules of chess apply, including winning by checkmate. But Dragonfly follows these special rules:

 A bishop, knight, or rook that is captured enters the capturing player's pieces in hand in their own color. As a move, a player may drop any one of the pieces they have in hand on any open square (if the move is otherwise legal). Captured pawns do not go in hand and are instead removed from the game.
 Pawns do not have an initial double-step option. (So, en passant is not possible.) A pawn promotes when reaching the furthest  to any piece of the player's choosing from those currently held in hand by their opponent. (If the opponent has none, then a pawn move to the furthest rank may not be made.) The chosen piece is removed from the opponent's in-hand stock.
 Castling is permitted, and normal castling conventions apply, with the king shifting over two squares in either direction. But castling with a dropped rook is not allowed.

Dragonfly hex

Dragonfly on the hex board is played the same as Dragonfly 7×7, except that pieces move and capture as in Gliński's hexagonal chess (with the exceptions that pawns have no initial double-step option, and castling is permitted).

See also
 Crazyhouse
 Hexshogi
 Shogi
 Yari Shogi

References

Bibliography

External links

 Official website MindSports.nl
 Dragonfly by Hans L. Bodlaender, The Chess Variant Pages
 Zillions of Games by Ed van Zon
 Dragonfly a simple program by Ed Friedlander (Java)

Chess variants
1983 in chess
Board games introduced in 1983